Gohilwad or State of Gohilwad may refer to the following places in Gujarat, western India:

Gohilwad or Gohilwar prant,  one of the four districts of Kathiawar in Gujarat, named after the Gohil Rajputs
 Bhavnagar State, a princely state, as land of its ruling Rajput clan, the Gohils
 Gohilwad Timbo, a mountain